|}

The City Plate is a Listed flat horse race in Great Britain open to horses aged three years or older.
It is run at Chester over a distance of 7 furlongs and 1 yard (1,409 metres), and it is scheduled to take place each year in July.

The race was given its current name and awarded Listed status in 2008.

Winners since 2003

See also
 Horse racing in Great Britain
 List of British flat horse races

References
Racing Post:

Flat races in Great Britain
Chester Racecourse
Open mile category horse races